Detective Ryan Wolfe  is a fictional character on the CBS crime drama CSI: Miami, portrayed by Jonathan Togo.

Background
Ryan Wolfe, a former patrol officer, is hired after CSI Tim Speedle is killed on the job. He has a strong background in science, having majored in chemistry at Boston College and now pursuing a master's degree in genetics. His master's degree takes a back seat to his job; he graduated top of his class at the police academy, well on his way to a promotion.

He catches the attention of CSI Lieutenant Horatio Caine at the scene of a bus crash. He showed great attention to detail and to the care of his sidearm, a Beretta 92, reflecting the fixation on minute details emerging from his obsessive-compulsive disorder. His eye for detail won Caine's respect, since poor gun maintenance led to the misfire at a critical moment that contributed to Wolfe's predecessor, Tim Speedle's tragic death in the Season 3 opener.

He is left-handed as seen in the episode, "Sex and Taxes". In season 7, episode 6 it is revealed that Ryan is afraid of heights. On the Stoned Cold episode, in which a victim was a school bully, he revealed to Eric Delko that he was bullied as a child which resulted in a neck injury as well as damage to a telescope he saved up on his allowance for. His colleagues later surprised him with a new telescope in his locker.

Relationship with colleagues
When he first joins the lab, Ryan has a difficult time with his co-workers. The team was still reeling from Speedle's death and he faced some tension when Speedle's past cases came under review. His friendship with Calleigh Duquesne started on a sour note as she was concerned initially because Wolfe's first case is a possible vehicular homicide involving her alcoholic father, lawyer Kendall "Duke" Duquesne. They came into conflict over evidence handling practices in several episodes but she comes to accept his presence. Medical examiner Alexx Woods resented him at first, telling him at one point that she "[doesn't] need any new friends." The two eventually became close and Woods becomes something of a maternal figure to the much younger Ryan. He also incurred DNA analyst Maxine Valera's wrath when he unintentionally spotted an error in her database which led to her suspension.

Eric Delko, who had been close to Speedle, was still angry over his friend's murder, and often acted as though he regards Wolfe as an interloper. During Season 4, there was visible tension between the two, leading Valera to comment that they should go into a room and "beat each other up". From the following season onwards, they have put aside their differences and become close friends, though Eric occasionally seems to enjoy exercising his seniority by sending Ryan to do the dirtier work. In the episode Time Bomb, Ryan's home is searched for evidence linked to the murder of State Attorney Rebecca Nevins. After a loud argument with his fellow CSIs, Ryan gets escorted back to the police station, where he is questioned by Stetler and is taken to jail for allegedly hiding stolen diamonds which Eric found. He arrests Stetler after Eric brings forth new evidence linking Stetler to the diamonds, thanking Eric for having his back. In several instances as the seasons progressed, they have showed deep respect and care for one another: Delko dangerously driving Ryan to the hospital, unaided, after he finds him shot by a nail gun, and Ryan lashing out angrily at the man who shot Eric and acting patiently and kindly when he returns to CSI and makes several rookie mistаkes.

Ryan and Natalia Boa Vista dated briefly, but ultimately decided to keep their relationship professional. Natalia was still confused over her previous relationship with Eric, who was struggling between work and taking care of his sister Marisol, who was battling cancer. He was especially protective of her when her ex-husband Nick Townsend continuously harassed her.

After Eric temporarily left the team in season 8, Ryan befriended new CSI Walter Simmons and took him under his wing.

Ryan had a good working relationship with Alexx's replacement Tara Price and once colluded with Eric in playing a prank on her during her first week on the job. Her addiction to painkillers began to spiral out of control and he expressed his concern for her, citing his old gambling addiction. After giving her several chances to own up, he is forced to search her locker for stolen painkillers and watches resignedly as Stetler dismisses her.

Ryan becomes smitten with the former night shift employee Samantha Owens (played by Taylor Cole) and has given her a present to congratulate her for her promotion as a detective. Eric first gives her the present, but then tells her that the gift was from Ryan. On the No Good Deed episode, Ryan finds out that Sam has a boyfriend, Assistant State's Attorney Josh Avery (played by Ryan McPartlin). After finding out that Josh set up Sam, Ryan confronts Josh at his home and gets knocked out violently in Habeas Corpse. He finds Josh dead after waking up and gets interrogated. Ryan then discovers that Sam was Josh's killer and is crushed to find out that Sam left him and the crime scene. He is later consoled by his colleagues (including Sam's friend Walter, who was also a night shift employee), and Horatio joins the team and expects Ryan to pay for his drink.

On the job

As the lowest ranking CSI, Ryan was usually left to process the more gruesome evidence, including acid-dissolved cadavers, a headless body, collecting vomit from a janitor's mop cart and bagging Santería items used for curses and sacrifices (which later leads him to believe that the lab is cursed when several unfortunate events occur in episode).

In Season 4, Ryan was shot in the corner of his eye with a nail gun while taking over for Eric at a crime scene. Despite the tension between them, Eric was the first to arrive on the scene and rush him to the hospital. Ryan returned to work but misses a key piece of evidence, and approaches coroner Alexx Woods for help. It is later revealed that Ryan has possibly developed keratitis due to the injury.

Ryan has been portrayed as one who meticulously "follows the book" and is loyal and devoted to his job. When he was kidnapped, tortured and held hostage by the Russian mob, he refused to help them and only capitulated when they extracted a tooth and then threatened to kill a child hostage. However, he has let his emotions interfere with occupational protocol on occasion; once, he shoves the officer forcing the eviction of a family from their home. The officer filed a complaint against him but Horatio convinces him to drop it and warned Ryan to keep an eye on himself. In "Man Down", he realizes who shot Eric and lashed out at the suspect so furiously during the interrogation that he had to be pulled away and reprimanded by Calleigh.

Ryan had a gambling problem which got him into trouble on a number of occasions, especially in season 5. During an investigation involving a gambling cruise liner, Ryan's addiction resurfaces when Calleigh discovers a $100 note he paid her with is counterfeit and that he had placed bets on the cruise before. He is fired from the department after lying to Horatio regarding his relationship to a man to whom he owed $10,000 in poker debts. Yelina Salas, private investigator and former MDPD homicide detective, observes Ryan meeting the man in a secluded area to pay back the money. She brings her video evidence to Horatio, who confronts Ryan. At the end of the episode, Internal Affairs Sergeant Rick Stetler informs Ryan that he has been fired and orders him to leave the building.

Ryan does not remain unemployed long. He finds work as a consultant for a local television news broadcaster. Using his forensic skills, he reveals the face of a suspected carjacker on television, only to have the man turn up dead only a few hours later, a vigilante claiming credit for the death. As a result, he faces a great deal of hostility from his former colleagues, particularly Calleigh, though he does help as best he can by providing the names and numbers of people who called into the station with death threats for the carjacker. Ryan's cameraman is caught and nearly killed by a mantrap hidden in the sand to protect a stash of drugs. This, along with other evidence, reveals the carjacker's true cause of death. Ryan realizes that the sensationalism and glamor of television does not further the cause of justice. He leaves the station and reconciles with Horatio, who warns Ryan that his every action will be scrutinized closely. Ryan accepts this, and will evidently return to his former occupation.

Unfortunately, the bureaucracy within MDPD prevents Ryan from immediately resuming his duties at the crime lab. He finds temporary employment at a gun range, where he becomes integral in linking a weapon stolen from the same range to a man who murdered a parole officer. However, he became unsatisfied with the job and confided to Alexx that "the money sucks" and that he does not want to "live off [his] credit cards anymore". Horatio assigns him the task of being the bodyguard for a teenager who has become the target of internet stalkers. Although disappointed, Ryan accepted it and is welcomed back by his former colleagues. He has since put his gambling problems behind him. This past experience came in handy when he and Walter were investigating an attempted shooting of a fisherman who turned out to be a bookie with shady dealings and many enemies.

Because money is tight, Ryan takes a job as an expert witness in crime-scene procedure. His first case brings him into direct conflict with Natalia, because he intends to challenge her protocol in collecting evidence because she did not take it immediately to the lab. Natalia believes that Ryan set her up (she went to the gun range where Ryan worked to keep an appointment with an expert shooter), to which Ryan heatedly points out that he follows the evidence. By the episode "Sunblock", Ryan has been reinstated to his former job.

Ryan comes into conflict with over-ambitious young reporter Erica Sykes on a number of occasions, especially when she broadcast him at close range during an investigation, much to his chagrin. She occasionally turns up at crime scenes uninvited and Ryan would have to send her away. He is forced to strike a deal with her in several episodes when the team need her footage for their investigation.

In later seasons, the character has matured and in Season 8, Ryan is shown to be taking on more leadership responsibilities (e.g. directing investigations, interrogating suspects alone). He has since been promoted to CSI Level 3 and led investigations in Calleigh's absence. Ryan may have shown some leadership, as in the crossover episode "Bone Voyage", in which Dr. Raymond Langston, played by veteran actor Laurence Fishburne, crosses over Miami and later on CSI: NY before heading back to Las Vegas. Fishburne is the second actor to cross over 3 CSI's after Caruso, who appeared occasionally and separately, on all CSIs. This is also where an actor (Amanda MacDonald, who plays Madeline Briggs) becomes the first female to cross over all 3 CSIs as the same character.

In Season 10, Ryan and Walter survive an F2 tornado while trying to retrieve the body of a dead Art student. Walter gets locked in a closet after letting go of a string of Christmas lights he threw at Ryan to try and pull him to safety. Ryan is later found on the hood of a nearby car with minimal injuries, and Walter gets a commendation from Horatio for saving Ryan's life, which Walter feels he doesn't deserve. Ryan returns to work on the same day, and finds out that Walter had turned down the commendation, his reasons being that he had let go of the string. Ryan tells him that if Walter hadn't let go, he wouldn't have been able to anchor himself to some pipes and survived. Walter gets uplifted by this statement and they bump shoulders (Ryan's fist is injured and Walter can't do a high five because of his injuries).

References

External links
Actor Profile on CBS website

CSI: Miami characters
Fictional police officers
Fictional Miami-Dade Police Department detectives
Fictional scientists in television
Fictional gamblers
Television characters introduced in 2004